Aaron ben Moses Teomim was a Czech-Polish rabbinical scholar; born about 1630, probably in Prague, where the Teomim-Fränkel family, from Vienna, had settled; died in Chmielnik, Poland, July 8, 1690. In 1670 he was called as rabbi to Worms, where he succeeded Moses Samson Bacharach. Prior to this he had been a preacher at Prague. In a serious illness which overcame him on Passover evening, 1675 he vowed he would write a commentary on the Haggadah if he should be restored to health. On his recovery he published this commentary under the title "Maṭṭeh Aharon" (Aaron's Rod), Frankfort-on-the-Main, 1678. Another work, "Bigde Aharon" (Aaron's Vestments), homilies on the Pentateuch, was published after the author's death at Frankfort-on-the-Main, 1710. His "Glosses on Shulḥan 'Aruk, Ḥoshen Mishpaṭ" remained in manuscript. Responsa of his are found in the collections of Yair Bacharach, "Ḥawwot Yair," and in those of Eliakim Goetz b. Meir of Hildesheim, "Eben ha-Shoham." In 1677 Aaron received a call to Lissa in Poland, which he declined; but in 1690 he accepted a call to the rabbinical seat of Cracow. He was there but three months when a Polish nobleman, probably in order to blackmail the congregation, ordered his arrest in Chmelnik, whither he had gone to attend the congregational Meeting of the Four Lands (Arba' Araẓot). On Sabbath, July 8, 1690, he was arrested, placed on horseback, and hurried to prison. He fell off the horse several times and was as often remounted. Before the jail was reached he had died of fright and ill-treatment. He was buried at Pintchov.

In his rabbinical works, Teomim uses typical pilpulistic methodology. His scholastic discourses are in accordance with the vogue of that age. That his theories, as exhibited in his treatment of the Haggadah, were appreciated by his contemporaries, is proved by the fact that his Haggadah was reprinted three times: at Amsterdam, in 1695; at Frankfort-on-the-Main, in 1710; at Amsterdam, in 1712.

References

External links
Hagadah Shel Pesach Mateh Ahron

17th-century Bohemian people
1630s births
1690 deaths
Jewish scholars
17th-century Polish rabbis
Rabbis from Prague
Jewish Czech writers